Jason Roeder is the drummer of the Oakland-based metal bands Neurosis and Sleep. And he played the drums for the fictional band Midnight Riders from Left 4 Dead series.

He played in the hardcore punk band Violent Coercion with Scott Kelly and Dave Edwardson before the trio formed Neurosis in 1985. The group also formed experimental/noise project Tribes of Neurot, Neurosis' alter ego. In 2010, Roeder replaced the retiring drummer of the stoner metal band Sleep.

Equipment
Roeder plays on kits with only a single rack and floor tom since he was 12 years old since the basic set-up forces more creativity. He custom builds his own snare drums while using DW hardware and Paiste cymbals.

Discography
Neurosis
Pain of Mind (1987)
The Word as Law (1990)
Souls at Zero (1992)
Enemy of the Sun (1993)
Through Silver in Blood (1996)
Times of Grace (1999)
A Sun That Never Sets (2001)
The Eye of Every Storm (2004)
Given to the Rising (2007)
Honor Found in Decay (2012)
Fires Within Fires (2016)

Neurosis & Jarboe
Neurosis & Jarboe (2003)

Tribes of Neurot
Rebegin (1995)
Silver Blood Transmission (1995)
Static Migration (1998)
Grace (1999)
60° (2000)
Adaptation and Survival: the Insect Project (2002)
Meridian (2005)

Sleep
"The Clarity" (2014)
The Sciences (2018)
"Leagues Beneath" (2018)

References

American heavy metal drummers
Living people
Year of birth missing (living people)
Sleep (band) members
Neurosis (band) members